Ann and Eliza was launched at Calcutta in December 1789. She was the sixth vessel registered at Calcutta and the cost of her hull, masts, and copper sheathing was Rupees 34,000. Ann and Eliza, Haldane, master, was lost in 1795 at Algoa Bay while on a voyage from Bengal to the Cape of Good Hope. The British East India Company (EIC) had engaged her in Bengal to carry stores to His Majesty's troops at the Cape. The EIC charged the loss to "His Majesty's Government".

Notes

Citations

References
 
 

1789 ships
British ships built in India
Age of Sail merchant ships of England
Ships of the British East India Company
Maritime incidents in 1795